Langar is an urban-type settlement in Navoiy Region, Uzbekistan. It is part of Xatirchi District. The town population in 1989 was 3738 people.

References

Populated places in Navoiy Region
Urban-type settlements in Uzbekistan